is a Japanese light novel series written by Kōko Shirakawa and illustrated by Ayuko. Shueisha have published seven volumes from April 2018 to April 2022 under their Shueisha Orange Bunko imprint. The series is set in fictional ancient China.

An anime television series adaptation by Bandai Namco Pictures aired from October to December 2022.

Characters

At sixteen years of age, she is the latest successor to the title of "Raven Consort."  She lives at the Ye Ming Palace deep in the inner palace; and despite her title of Consort, she does no nighttime duties, and has no contact with the Emperor.  She uses mysterious arts to perform things such as calling forth spirits of the deceased and exorcising and purifying them to rest in peace in Paradise.  Despite the fact that she should live her days in seclusion with only her niaobu (familiar), a golden-yellow chicken named Xing-Xing (she calls him the "Watchman of Niao Lian"), she is accompanied by a lady-in-waiting and a few servants inside her residence.  And despite her tsundere attitude, she cannot resist when being served baozi, her favorite food.

She is the last surviving members of the Luan Family, the previous dynasty known for their silver hair.  A powerful man named Yandi had them all exterminated due to false accusations of treason, including her mother, who had her dye her silver hair black; and their ghosts haunted him until he died.  Orphaned, she was driven into slavery until the previous Raven Consort chose her and groomed her to be her successor. Only Emperor Gaojun, Wei Qing, and the people inside Ye Ming Palace know she dyes her hair black, and keep it secret as Emperor Gaojun promised not to kill her. Eventually, the death warrant on all survivors of the Luan is repealed. She learns she harbors the very essence of "the Raven" herself deep within her and she is gradually becoming consumed by her deep pain and rage.

The current emperor.  After being disinherited as a child after his mother was murdered, he seized power in an uprising against the corrupt Empress Dowager and had her executed later. He has a semi-cordial relationship with Shouxue, vowing to protect her and release her from such a fate by any means.

Emperor Gaojun's attendant. He is a bit callous when talking to Shouxue but nevertheless treating her with respect and changed later on.

Formerly known as Que Er, who was orphaned when his mother committed suicide, and was tricked into a life of a male prostitute after trying to become an eunuch.  Running away, the young Gaojun sheltered him and took him in as his attendant, and gave him his new name.

The cheerful lady-in-waiting to the current Raven Consort.  Shouxue met her while snooping around in disguise outside of the Ye Ming Palace while working on a case, and later took her in as her lady-in-waiting.

An eunuch assigned by Wei Qing to protect Shouxue.  He made himself known to her when she and Jiu-jiu were attacked by the former Empress Dowager's men.

Another of Emperor Gaojun's assistants, but acting as his eyes and ears outside of the inner palace. He is laid-back most of the time, but is competent in his duties.

 
A new eunuch from Feiyan Palace with which Jiu-jiu is acquainted with. He is later taken in by the Raven Consort after being dismissed by his former master.

Known as the "Flower Princess," she is the consort from Yuanqian Palace—actually the Second Consort, in charge of looking after the inner palace. She becomes acquainted with Shouxue after she had helped her with a case concerning her lover, and considers her as her "younger sister."

Media

Light novel
At Anime Expo 2022, Seven Seas Entertainment announced that they licensed the series for English publication.

Anime
On December 14, 2021, an anime adaptation was announced. It was later confirmed to be a television series produced by Bandai Namco Pictures and directed by Chizuru Miyawaki, with Satomi Ooshima overseeing the scripts, Shinji Takeuchi adapting Ayuko's character designs for animation, and Asami Tachibana composing the music. It aired from October 1 to December 24, 2022, on Tokyo MX, GYT, GTV, BS11, and KTV. Crunchyroll licensed the series, and have streamed an English dub starting on October 22, 2022.

Reception

Sales 
The series has over 1.2 million copies in circulation as of 2023.

See also
 The Earl and the Fairy, a light novel series whose manga adaptation was illustrated by Ayuko

Notes

References

External links
 
 

2018 Japanese novels
Anime and manga based on light novels
Aniplex
Bandai Namco Pictures
Crunchyroll anime
Historical fantasy anime and manga
Japanese fantasy novels
Japanese mystery novels
Light novels
Mystery anime and manga
Novels set in ancient China
Seven Seas Entertainment titles
Shueisha books
Supernatural anime and manga
Television series set in ancient China
Tokyo MX original programming